The 1980 Maryland Terrapins football team represented the University of Maryland in the 1980 NCAA Division I-A football season. In their ninth season under head coach Jerry Claiborne, the Terrapins compiled an 8–4 record (5–1 in conference), finished in second place in the Atlantic Coast Conference, and outscored their opponents 211 to 165. The team finished its season with a 35–20 loss to Florida in the 1980 Tangerine Bowl. The team's statistical leaders included Mike Tice with 928 passing yards, Charlie Wysocki with 1,359 rushing yards, and Chris Havener with 436 receiving yards.

Schedule

Roster

Game summaries

at North Carolina

at Pittsburgh

vs. Florida (Tangerine Bowl)

References

Maryland
Maryland Terrapins football seasons
Maryland Terrapins football